Leaving is an album of duets by pianist Richard Beirach and flautist Jeremy Steig recorded in 1976 and originally released on the Japanese Trio label before being rereleased on the Danish Storyville label on CD in 1988.

Reception

The AllMusic review by Scott Yanow stated, "In general the music is peaceful with some dissonances. Steig provides long tones while Beirach creates light rhythmic patterns and, although it does not entirely stay at the same emotional level, the music is generally quite dry and uneventful".

Track listing
All compositions by Richard Bierach except where noted
 "Angelo" − 3:11
 "Waterlillies" (Richard Beirach, Jeremy Steig) − 2:46
 "Liebsong" − 3:04	
 "The Unforeseen" (Beirach, Steig) − 3:28	
 "Mitsuku" − 5:03
 "Within a Song" − 2:43
 "Amethyst" − 3:32
 "Orphan" (Beirach, Steig) − 2:25	
 "Splivy" (Beirach, Steig) − 1:20	
 "Leaving" − 4:56

Personnel
 Richard Beirach − piano
Jeremy Steig – alto flute, soprano flute, bass flute, piccolo

References

Storyville Records albums
Richie Beirach albums
Jeremy Steig albums
1976 albums
Collaborative albums